The Presbyterian Church in Korea (SungHapChuk) was founded in 1984 when it separated from the Presbyterian Church in Korea (YeJong). Pastor Chung Bong-Kuk was the leading figure. The Apostles Creed, the Westminster Confession of Faith are the standards. In 2004 it had 39,000 members and 155 congregations in 9 Presbyteries and a General assembly.

References 

Presbyterian denominations in South Korea